Home automation for the elderly and disabled focuses on making it possible for older adults and people with disabilities to remain at home, safe and comfortable. Home automation is becoming a viable option for older adults and people with disabilities who would prefer to stay in the comfort of their homes rather than move to a healthcare facility. This field uses much of the same technology and equipment as home automation for security, entertainment, and energy conservation but tailors it towards old people and people with disabilities.

Concept 
There are two basic forms of home automation systems for the elderly: embedded health systems and private health networks. Embedded health systems integrate sensors and microprocessors in appliances, furniture, and clothing which collect data that is analyzed and can be used to diagnose diseases and recognize risk patterns. Private health networks implement wireless technology to connect portable devices and store data in a household health database. Due to the need for more healthcare options for the aging population "there is a significant interest from industry and policy makers in developing these technologies".

Home automation is implemented in homes of older adults and people with disabilities in order to maintain their independence and safety, also saving the costs and anxiety of moving to a health care facility. For those with disabilities smart homes give them opportunity for independence, providing emergency assistance systems, security features, fall prevention, automated timers, and alerts, also allowing monitoring from family members via an internet connection.

Telehealth implementation

Background 
Telehealth is the use of electronic technology services to provide patient care and improve the healthcare delivery system. The term is often confused with telemedicine, which specifically involves remote clinical services of healthcare delivery. Telehealth is the delivery of remote clinical and non-clinical services of healthcare delivery. Telehealth promotes the diagnosis, treatment, education, and self-management away from health care providers and into people's homes.

Reasons for implementation 
The goal of telehealth is to complement the traditional healthcare setting. There is an increased demand on the healthcare system from a growing elderly population and shortage of healthcare providers. Many elderly and disabled patients are faced with limited access to health care and providers. Telehealth may bridge the gap between patient demand and healthcare accessibility. Telehealth may also decrease healthcare costs and mitigate transportation concerns. For the elderly and disabled populations, telehealth would allow them to stay in the comfort and convenience of their homes.

Elderly population 
Geriatrics is the role of healthcare in providing care to the elderly population. The elderly population involves many health complications. According to the National Institute of Health, “the main threats are non-communicable diseases, including heart, stroke, cancer, diabetes, hypertension, and dementia”. Telehealth may help provide management and monitoring of chronic disease in patient homes.

One telemonitoring device measures vital signs: blood pressure, pulse, oxygen saturation, and weight. Another telemonitoring device is video-conferencing, which can provide patient-provider consultation and electronic delivery of medication instructions and general health information. Some studies have been done to analyze the effectiveness of telehealth on the elderly population. Some have found positive telehealth effects including reduction of symptoms and self-efficacy in the elderly population with chronic conditions. Other studies have found the opposite effect, where telehealth home care produced greater mortality than the traditional hospital setting. Then there are other studies that have found inconclusive results.

Disabled population 
Persons with severe functional disabilities are statistically the highest users of all health care services and represent a large portion of health care costs and designated service. The disabled population requires many self-monitoring and self-management strategies that place a strenuous burden on healthcare providers. Telecommunications technologies may provide a way to meet the healthcare demands of the disabled population. According to the National Institutes of Health, “the largest proportion of health care… result from individuals with severe functional disabilities, such as stroke and traumatic brain injury”. Patients with functional disabilities may benefit from telehealth care. According to the World Health Organization, functional limitation refers to the physical or mental conditions, which impair, interfere with, or impede one or more of the individual's major life activities and instrumental activities of daily living. Patients with spina bifida, musculoskeletal disorders, mental illness, or neurological disorders may also benefit from telehealth care services. Telehealth technologies include vital sign telemonitoring devices, exercise routines, problem-solving assessments, and therapeutic self-care management tasks. Telehealth care, however, is not sufficient in complete care but rather a supplement of separate care.

Ethical concerns and legalities 
Concerns of telehealth implementation include the limited scope of research that confirm conclusive benefits of telehealth in comparison to the healthcare setting. Currently there is no definitive conclusion that telehealth is the superior mode of healthcare delivery. There are also ethical issues about patient autonomy and patient acceptance of telehealth as a mode of healthcare. Lack of face-to-face patient-provider care in contrast to direct care in a traditional healthcare setting is an ethical concern for many.

In 2015 the Texas Medical Board ruled that state physicians had to physically meet patients before remotely treating ailments or prescribing medication. The telemedicine company Teladoc sued over the rule in Teladoc v. Texas Medical Board, arguing the bill violated antitrust laws by inflating prices and limiting the supply of health care providers in the state. The bill, meant to go active on June 3, 2015, was then stalled. Teladoc voluntarily dropped the lawsuit in 2017 after Texas passed a new bill allowing for remote treatment without a prior in-person interaction, which Teladoc Health had lobbied heavily for. On September 15, 2017, the Texas Medical Board amended its regulations to allow state-licensed healthcare providers to care for patients without required face-to-face interaction, potentially affecting up to 28 million patients in Texas.

Systems 
Home automation for healthcare can range from very simple alerts to lavish computer controlled network interfaces. Some of the monitoring or safety devices that can be installed in a home include lighting and motion sensors, environmental controls, video cameras, automated timers, emergency assistance systems, and alerts.

Security 
In order to maintain the security of the home many home automation systems integrate features such as remote keyless entry systems which will allow seniors to view who is at the door and then remotely open the door. Home networks can also be programmed to automatically lock doors and shut blinds in order to maintain privacy.

Emergency assistance systems and tools 
Emergency assistance for older adults and people with disabilities can be classified into three categories: First, Second, and Third Generation emergency assistance systems or tools.

First generation 
These simple systems and tools include personal alarm systems and emergency response telephones that do not have to be integrated into a smart home system. A typical system consists of a small wireless pendant transceiver to be worn around the neck or wrist. The system has a central unit plugged into a telephone jack, with a loudspeaker and microphone. When the pendant is activated a 24-hour control center is contacted.
Generally the 24 hour control center speaks to the user and identifies that help is required e.g. Emergency services are dispatched. The control center also has information of the user, e.g. medical symptoms, medication allergies, etc. The unit has a built in rechargeable battery backup and the ability to notify the control center if the battery is running low or if the system loses power. Modern systems have active wireless pendants that are polled frequently advising battery, and signal strength status as older style pendant could have a battery that has failed rendering the pendant useless when required in an emergency.

Second generation 
These systems and tools generate alarms and alerts automatically if significant changes are observed in the user's vital signs. These systems are usually fully integrated into a home network and allow health professionals to monitor patients at home. The system consists of an antenna that a patient holds over their implanted cardiac device to transmit data for downloading over the telephone line and viewing by the patient's physician. The collected data can be accessed by the patient or family members. Another example of this type of system is a Smart Shirt that measures heart rate, electrocardiogram results, respiration, temperature and other vital functions and alerts the patient or physician if there is a problem.

Third generation 
These types of systems would help older adults and people with disabilities deal with loneliness and depression by connecting them with other elderly or disabled individuals through the Internet, reducing their sense of isolation.

Reminder systems 
Home automation systems may include automatic reminder systems for the elderly. Such systems are connected to the Internet and make announcements over an intercom. They can prompt about doctor's appointments and taking medicine, as well as everyday activities such as turning off the stove, closing the blinds, locking doors, etc. Users choose what activities to be reminded of. The system can be set up to automatically perform tasks based on user activity, such as turning on the lights or adjusting room temperature when the user enters specified areas. Other systems can remind users at home or away from home to take their medicine, and how much, by using an alarm wristwatch with text message and medical alert. Reminder systems can also remind about everyday tasks such as eating lunch or walking the dog.

Some communities offer free telephone reassurance services to residents, which includes both safety check calls as well as reminders. These services have been credited with saving the lives of many elderly and senior citizens who choose to remain at home.

Medication dispensing and spoon-feeding 
Smart homes can implement medication dispensing devices in order to ensure that necessary medications are taken at appropriate times. Automated pill dispensers can dispense only the pills that are to be taken at that time and are locked; versions are available for Alzheimer's patients that have a lock on them. For diabetic patients a talking glucose monitor allows the patient to check their blood sugar level and take the appropriate injection. Digital thermometers are able to recognize a fever and alert physicians. Blood pressure and pulse monitors dispense hypertensive medications when needed.

There are also spoon-feeding robots.

Home robotics 
Domestic robots, connected to the domotic network, are included to perform or help in household chores such as cooking, cleaning etc. Dedicated robots can administer medications and alert a remote caregiver if the patient is about to miss his or her medicine dose (oral or no-oral medications).

Challenges 
The recent advances made in tailoring home automation toward the elderly have generated opposition. It has been stated that "Smart home technology will be helpful only if it is tailored to meet the individual needs of each patient". This currently creates a problem because many of the interfaces designed for home automation "are not designed to take functional limitations, associated with age, into consideration". Another presented problem involves making the system user-friendly for the elderly who often have difficulty operating electronic devices. The cost of the systems has also presented a challenge, as the U.S. government currently provides no assistance to seniors who choose to install these systems (in some countries such as Spain the Dependency Law includes this assistance).

The biggest concern expressed by potential users of smart home technology is "fear of lack of human responders or the possible replacement of human caregivers by technology", but home automation should be seen as something that augments, but does not replace, human care.

See also 
 Assisted living
 Disability robot and domestic robot
 Elderly care
 Floor plans and house navigation system
 Gerontechnology
 Healthcare robot
 Home robot
 Indoor positioning system
 Roujin Z, a film that uses assistive domotics as a central plot device.
 Transgenerational design

References

Further reading 
Slatalla, Michele. "Is 'Smart House' Still an Oxymoron?" New York Times. 31 July 2008.

Assistive technology
Home automation
Patient safety
Housing for the elderly
Gerontology